Dobson Yacht Club (DYC) is a private yacht club based in Westmount, Nova Scotia, Canada. The Dobson Yacht Club sits on the western shore of the South Arm of Sydney Harbour, directly opposite the Sydney downtown area, part of the Cape Breton Regional Municipality. Its location on the chart (4266 Sydney Harbour) is shown as Dobson's Point, formerly known as Shingle Point.

History

The Dobson Yacht Club came to be in the year 1953, a time of relative prosperity in Cape Breton. Sydney Steel was booming and coal was still "King". It was a time of rebuilding and hard work following the war, but it was also a time when recreation was important as a diversion from the everyday realities of life.

One such diversion was Snipe racing. These small sailing vessels provided an inexpensive form of entertainment. Sydney Harbour's only yacht club, the Royal Cape Breton was reaping the benefits of the increase in the number of Snipe racing enthusiasts. However, several members of the Royal Cape Breton's Snipe Sailing Fleet had become disillusioned with some of the restrictive practices of that club so they began to consider starting their own yacht club.

They had no assets, but they were attracted to a piece of land directly across the harbour called Shingle Point. There was safe anchorage on the southwest side of the property that would be ideal for the Snipe fleet. This property formed a part of the "Dobson Estate", located across the Westmount Highway from Shingle Point. This estate was an early land grant from the Crown to the Dobson family and it included all the rights to the water frontage bordering on the estate.

In 1953, the estate belonged to Mr. Sidney Dobson and several of his sisters. One of the sailors trying to establish this second Sydney Harbour yacht club was a young man named Roy Mac Keen. His mother was Myrtle Mac Keen, née Dobson, and she was one of the sisters in control of the Dobson Estate. She was also very sympathetic to the cause that had captured her son's attention.

Negotiations began between the sailors and the Dobson family and a price of $3,000 was placed on the property. Twelve original members paid $100 each, plus a membership fee of $20. Some of the members fronted a loan for the balance and, in late 1953, adopting the name of its benefactor, The Dobson Yacht Club was born.

The original clubhouse was a shack from the construction site of the then-new Federal Building on Dorchester Street. In the spring of 1954, the water's edge in the southwest cove was only 9–12 metres from the clubhouse itself. The next order of business was to purchase a new clubhouse.

At this time the old military barracks on Royal Avenue, near the Sydney City Hospital, were being sold for one dollar each with the condition that they be removed from the site. After purchasing one of these buildings the members hired Mr. W. Carson to move the building. This was done by separating the building in two and moving it through the streets of Sydney down to the Cape Breton Dairy on the waterfront and then floating the structures across the harbour on a barge in September 1955.

During the mid-fifties to mid-sixties, the Snipe Sailing Team from Dobson became a force to be reckoned within maritime racing circles. The team won the Provincial Snipe Championships three times, the Maritime Championship three times and the Dominion Championship once. Many other trophies, including the McCurdy Cup (emblematic of the Championship of the Bras d'Or Lakes) took their place at Dobson.

Facilities
The club is open year-round, navigation is limited by ice January through April.

Formalities
Vessels arriving from another country must report to Canada Border Services Agency at 1 888 226 7277.

Marina facilities 
Protection/shelter - good from all directions.
Approach and entrance - safe, easy, used by largest cruise ships
Maximum length - 
Depths at slips - 
Water - dockside water, chlorine and fluoride free from the club's own wells
Electric - 15 amp power available at floating docks, wharves and camber
Fuel - gas and diesel (Dobson Yacht Club has the only dockside fueling facility in Sydney Harbour)
Weather forecast - VHF
Security - unfenced, security not an issue in this low-crime area.
Internet access - free wireless internet covers the club grounds and a computer terminal in the clubhouse is available for guests (password available at bar)
Other marina facilities, services and supplies - washrooms, showers, laundromat are available to visiting yachts (0700 - 2400).

Boatyard facilities and services
Launch ramp for trailers or commercial lift
Mast crane dockside at camber
Boat storage is available throughout the year.

Clubhouse Facilities
Members and guests lounge and bar open 7 days a week, noon to 11:00pm
Full kitchen facilities in clubhouse (self serve only, no restaurant on-site)
Decks overlooking the harbour and marina
Picnic tables on club's waterside lawn
Washrooms and showers: 7:00am to 11:00pm.  Washrooms and showers are available to members and visitors paying dockage. There is no additional charge for showers.
Coin-operated washer and dryer in clubhouse
Ice available at clubhouse Bar
ATM located in clubhouse
Short and long term on-site parking for members and guests' vehicles
VHF access-club monitors channels 16 and 68

Local Services
Shopping and dining at area merchants approximately

Regattas
Dobson Splash Fest - The Dobson YC Fishing Boat Races and Sailing Regatta is usually held the first weekend after Labour Day, this end-of-season event is a celebration party for working fishing vessels and crews, with exhibits by marine equipment and service suppliers. Two days of sailboat and fishing boat racing, dances, poker runs, fun events, and entertainment for the children.

Traditions
A 5-foot model of Bluenose has been on display in Dobson Yacht Club's main entrance showcase since 2009.

References

External links

 Dobson Yacht Club official site
 Dobson Yacht Club on Marinas.com
 Cruising Cape Breton — The Cruisers' Guide to Cape Breton Island and the Bras d'Or Lakes

Yacht clubs in Canada
1953 establishments in Nova Scotia
Cultural infrastructure completed in 1953